Vicenç Bou i Geli (19 January 1885 – 6 January 1962) was a Catalan Spanish composer. He was most well known for his compositions of the traditional sardanes, which he wrote with great fluency and little sophistication, but with a gift for charming and ingenious melody.

Biography
Vicenç Bou was born in Torroella de Montgrí. His father was Genis Bou Carreras and his mother Rita Geli Fontanet. He had his first music lessons from his father who was a fiscorn player of the town cobla band La Lira, one of the oldest in Catalonia. Later he learnt his principal instrument, the flabiol, with Pere Rigau. However he first joined the La Lira band at the age of 15, as a trombonist.

He learnt violin with Josep Reixac and composition with Josep Maria Soler and Josep Pi, completing his formal musical education in 1906.

In 1906 he married Teresa Robau, with whom he had five sons.

Sardanas
In 1909 he composed the first of his more than 175 sardanes, which are the works he is most well known for. Among his most popular are

 Esperança
 Cants de maig 
 L'anell de prometatge
 Voliaines
 Angelina
 Continuïtat
 Girona aimada 
 Festamajonera 
 Mimosa
 Mar de xaloc
 Revetlla 
 Esclats de joventut 
 Tossa
 Flor de mar
 L'espigolera
 De Sant Feliu a S'Agaró
 Els meus de Barcelona 
 La somrienta 
 Montserrat
 Regalims del cor
 Èxtasi
 Mariagna 
 Sospirs d'amor 
 Otília
 Flor de llevant 
 La mare cantora 
 Mirambell 
 Tonades de pastor
 El saltiró de la cardina
 Llevantina
 La cardina encara salta
 Pescadors bons catalans
 Torroella vila vella
 Record de Calella

Musical legacy
In 1984 the family of the composer donated his personal archive to the Arxiu Historic de Torroella de Montgri. This consisted of 250 works in manuscript, 150 books and 200 written works.
His sardana El saltiró de la cardina with words by Josep Maria Francès (composed 1912) is played in the 1957 film Spanish Affair.

References

External Links

Vicenç Bou i Geli, Biography and works in Musics per la Cobla (CA)

1885 births
1962 deaths
20th-century classical composers
20th-century Spanish male musicians
20th-century Spanish musicians
Composers from Catalonia
Sardana
Spanish classical composers
Spanish male classical composers